Ridge is a village and civil parish in the Hertsmere borough of Hertfordshire, situated between Potters Bar and Shenley. At the 2011 Census  the village was a civil parish in its own name. The population of the parish was 177.

It has a church, St Margaret's; a children's playground; and the Old Guinea public house, which serves food on most days. The village holds an annual fete on the August bank holiday. Ridge is surrounded by countryside with numerous public footpaths. In 1926, the parish boundary between Ridge, Hertfordshire, and South Mimms, Middlesex, was subject to a minor adjustment.

Clare Hall in Ridge is a former manor house, built around 1745 by Thomas Roberts, a linen draper from St Albans. It was originally called Clay Hall and renamed Clare Hall in 1750. From 1886 to 1974, Clare Hall was used as an isolation hospital for diseases including smallpox and tuberculosis. It was taken over by the Imperial Cancer Research Fund in 1980 as a research laboratory. It is now part of the Francis Crick Institute.

Field Marshal Harold Alexander, 1st Earl Alexander of Tunis, the World War II commander and former Governor General of Canada, is buried in St Margaret's churchyard.

References

External links

 St Margaret's Church

Villages in Hertfordshire
Hertsmere
Civil parishes in Hertfordshire